Kevin Rafter is an Irish academic and non-executive director. He is the author of numerous books on media and politics topics, having previously worked as a political journalist.

Career
Rafter is currently Head of the School of Communications at Dublin City University where he is Full Professor of Political Communication. He is also Chairperson of the Compliance Committee of the Broadcasting Authority of Ireland and Chairperson of the Independent Advisory Committee of Culture Ireland.

He chaired an independent review panel on civil service reform in 2015 and was the independent rapporteur to the talks that led to the formation of Ireland's minority coalition in 2016. He is a board member of Dublin Bus and Oxfam Ireland.

In June 2019 Rafter was appointed Chair of the Arts Council.

Prior to 2008, Rafter held editorial positions with the Irish Times (political reporter), Sunday Times (political correspondent), Sunday Tribune (political editor/assistant editor), Magill magazine (editor) and RTÉ, the Irish national broadcaster (Prime Time reporter and This Week presenter).

Publications
Rafter has authored/edited over a dozen books including, most recently, Political Advertising in the 2014 European Parliament Elections (2017). 
His previous books include biography Martin Mansergh (2002) - and several histories of Irish political parties including Clann na Poblachta (1996), Sinn Féin (2005), Democratic Left (2010), and Fine Gael(2010)

His list of academic publications include numerous book chapters and research journal articles with a specific focus on media and politics including a study of Irish journalists in 2016.

References

External links
DCU Profile Page

Year of birth missing (living people)
Living people
Alumni of Trinity College Dublin
Alumni of University College Dublin
Irish magazine editors
Irish writers
Magill people
RTÉ newsreaders and journalists
RTÉ Radio 1 presenters
Sunday Tribune people
The Irish Times people
People associated with Dublin City University